Julius Christiaan van Oven (17 November 1881 – 16 March 1963) was a Dutch jurist and politician of the Labour Party (PvdA).

For 34 years, Van Oven was professor of Roman law, from 1917 to 1925 at the University of Groningen and from 1925 to 1951 at Leiden University. In 1948 he was elected a member of the Royal Netherlands Academy of Arts and Sciences. At the age of 74, he was asked to succeed Leendert Antonie Donker, who died in office in February 1956, as Minister of Justice in the Third Drees cabinet. During the 8 months he was in office, he managed to establish a law he had been advocating for since 1927: this Lex-Van Oven law finally annulled the legal incapacity of married women, including the prohibition for them to hold office.

Decorations

References

External links

Official
  Mr.Dr. J.C. van Oven Parlement & Politiek

1881 births
1963 deaths
20th-century Dutch educators
20th-century Dutch lawyers
20th-century Dutch male writers
20th-century Dutch politicians
Commanders of the Order of Orange-Nassau
Dutch legal scholars
Dutch magazine editors
Dutch newspaper editors
Dutch people of Jewish descent
Dutch people of World War II
Dutch political writers
Knights of the Order of the Netherlands Lion
Labour Party (Netherlands) politicians
Legal historians
Academic staff of Leiden University
Members of the Royal Netherlands Academy of Arts and Sciences
Ministers of Justice of the Netherlands
Ministers of the Interior of the Netherlands
Jurisprudence academics

People from Dordrecht
People from Leiden
Rectors of universities in the Netherlands
Scholars of Roman law
University of Amsterdam alumni
Academic staff of the University of Groningen
20th-century Dutch historians